The 74th annual Cannes Film Festival took place from 6 to 17 July 2021, after having been originally scheduled from 11 to 22 May 2021. American director Spike Lee was invited to be the head of the jury for the festival for a second time, after the COVID-19 pandemic in France scuttled plans to have him head the jury of the 2020 Cannes Film Festival.

The Official Selection was announced on 3 June 2021. French film director Leos Carax's musical film Annette was the opening film of the festival.  Arthur Harrari's Onoda: 10,000 Nights in the Jungle opened the Un Certain Regard section.  The Honorary Palme d'Or was awarded to American actress and filmmaker Jodie Foster, and Italian filmmaker Marco Bellocchio.

The Palme d'Or went to Titane, directed by Julia Ducournau, who became the second female director to win the award and the first to win not jointly with another director (in 1993 Jane Campion had won jointly with Chen Kaige). At the awards ceremony on 17 July 2021, jury head Spike Lee made a gaffe by accidentally announcing the festival's top prize winner at the start of the night instead of the end.

Mistress of ceremonies was the actress Doria Tillier.

Juries

Main competition
Spike Lee, American director, Jury President
Mati Diop, French-Senegalese director and actress
Mylène Farmer, Canadian-French singer and songwriter
Maggie Gyllenhaal, American actress, director, and producer
Jessica Hausner, Austrian director and screenwriter
Mélanie Laurent, French actress and director
Kleber Mendonça Filho, Brazilian director, film programmer, and critic
Tahar Rahim, French actor
Song Kang-ho, South Korean actor

Un Certain Regard
Andrea Arnold, British director, Jury President
Daniel Burman, Argentine director 
Michael Angelo Covino, American director and actor
Mounia Meddour, Algerian director 
Elsa Zylberstein, French actress

Caméra d'or
Mélanie Thierry, French actress, Jury President
Audrey Abiven, French director of Tri Track (post-synchronization company)
Éric Caravaca, French actor and director
Romain Cogitore, French director, screenwriter and photographer
Laurent Dailland, French director of photography
Pierre-Simon Gutman, French critic

Cinéfondation and short films
Sameh Alaa, Egyptian director 
Kaouther Ben Hania, Tunisian director
Carlos Muguiro, Spanish director
Tuva Novotny, Swedish director and actress 
Nicolas Pariser, French director
Alice Winocour, French director

Independent juries
International Critics' Week
Cristian Mungiu, Romanian director and screenwriter, Jury President
Didar Domehri, French producer
Camélia Jordana, French actress, composer and singer
Michel Merkt, Swiss producer
Karel Och, Czech artistic director of the Karlovy Vary International Film Festival

L'Œil d'or
Ezra Edelman, American director, Jury President
Julie Bertuccelli, French director
Iris Brey, French journalist, author and critic
Déborah François, Belgian actress
Orwa Nyrabia, Syrian director, producer and artistic director of the International Documentary Film Festival Amsterdam

Queer Palm
Nicolas Maury, French actor and director, Jury President
Josza Anjembe, French director, screenwriter and journalist
Roxane Mesquida, French actress
Vahram Muratyan, French artist and graphic designer
Aloïse Sauvage, French actress and singer

Official selection

In competition
The following films were selected to compete for the Palme d'Or:

(QP) indicates film in competition for the Queer Palm.

Un Certain Regard
The following films were selected to compete in the Un Certain Regard section:

(CdO) indicates film eligible for the Caméra d'Or as a feature directorial debut.
(QP) indicates film in competition for the Queer Palm.

Out of competition
The following films were selected to be screened out of competition:

Cannes Premiere
The following films were selected to be screened in the Cannes Premiere section:

(CdO) indicates film eligible for the Caméra d'Or as a feature directorial debut.

Special Screenings

(CdO) indicates film eligible for the Caméra d'Or as a feature directorial debut.

Cinema for the Climate
Ephemeral section of films about environment:

Short films
Out of 3,739 entries, the following films were selected to compete for the Short Film Palme d'Or.

(QP) indicates film in competition for the Queer Palm.

Cinéfondation
The Cinéfondation section focuses on films made by students at film schools. The following 17 entries (13 live-action and 4 animated films) were selected out of 1,835 submissions. Four of the films selected represent schools participating in Cinéfondation for the first time.

(QP) indicates film in competition for the Queer Palm.

Cannes Classics
The full line-up for the Cannes Classics section was announced on 22 June 2021.

Restorations

Documentaries

Cinéma de la plage 
The following films have been selected to be screened out of competition, in the "Cinéma de la plage" section.

Parallel sections

International Critics' Week
The following films were selected to be screened in the International Critics' Week.

Features 

(CdO) indicates film eligible for the Caméra d'Or as a feature directorial debut.

Short films 

(QP) indicates film in competition for the Queer Palm.

Special screenings 

(CdO) indicates film eligible for the Caméra d'Or as a feature directorial debut.
(QP) indicates film in competition for the Queer Palm.

Invitation 
Films from Morelia International Film Festival:

Directors' Fortnight
The following films were selected to be screened in the Directors' Fortnight section:

Features 

(CdO) indicates film eligible for the Caméra d'Or as a feature directorial debut.
(QP) indicates film in competition for the Queer Palm.

Special screenings

Short and medium-length films

(QP) indicates film in competition for the Queer Palm.

Awards

Official awards

In Competition
The following awards were presented for films shown In Competition:

 Palme d'Or: Titane by Julia Ducournau
 Grand Prix: 
 A Hero by Asghar Farhadi
 Compartment No. 6 by Juho Kuosmanen
 Best Director: Leos Carax for Annette
 Best Actress: Renate Reinsve for The Worst Person in the World
 Best Actor: Caleb Landry Jones for Nitram
 Best Screenplay: Ryusuke Hamaguchi & Takamasa Oe for Drive My Car
 Jury Prize: 
 Ahed's Knee by Nadav Lapid
 Memoria by Apichatpong Weerasethakul

Un Certain Regard
 Un Certain Regard Award: Unclenching the Fists by Kira Kovalenko
 Un Certain Regard  Jury Prize: Great Freedom by Sebastian Meise
 Un Certain Regard Ensemble Prize: Bonne mère by Hafsia Herzi
 Un Certain Regard Prize of Courage: La Civil by Teodora Mihai
 Un Certain Regard Prize of Originality: Lamb by Valdimar Jóhannsson
 Un Certain Regard Special Mention: Prayers for the Stolen by Tatiana Huezo

Golden Camera
 Caméra d'Or: Murina by Antoneta Alamat Kusijanović

Short films
 Short Film Palme d'Or: All the Crows in the World by Tang Yi
 Special Mention: August Sky by Jasmin Tenucci

Cinéfondation
 First Prize: The Salamander Child by Théo Degen
 Second Prize: Cicada by Yoon Daewoen
 Third Prize: 
 Love Stories on the Move by Carina-Gabriela Daşoveanu
 Cantareira by Rodrigo Ribeyro

Honorary Palme d'Or
 Honorary Palme d'Or: Jodie Foster and Marco Bellocchio

Independent awards

FIPRESCI Prizes
 In Competition: Drive My Car by Ryusuke Hamaguchi
 Un Certain Regard: Playground by Laura Wandel
 Parallel section: Feathers by Omar El Zohairy (International Critics' Week)

Ecumenical Prize
 Prize of the Ecumenical Jury: Drive My Car by Ryusuke Hamaguchi
 Special Mention: Compartment No. 6 by Juho Kuosmanen

International Critics' Week
 Nespresso Grand Prize: Feathers by Omar El Zohairy
 Leitz Cine Discovery Prize for Short Film: Lili Alone by Zou Jing
 Louis Roederer Foundation Rising Star Award: Sandra Melissa Torres for Amparo

Directors' Fortnight
 Europa Cinemas Label Award for Best European Film: A Chiara by Jonas Carpignano
 SACD Award for Best French-language Film: Magnetic Beats by Vincent Maël Cardona
 Carrosse d'Or: Frederick Wiseman

L'Œil d'or
 L'Œil d'or: A Night of Knowing Nothing by Payal Kapadia

Queer Palm
 Queer Palm Award: The Divide by Catherine Corsini

Prix François Chalais
 François Chalais Prize: A Hero by Asghar Farhadi
 Special Mention: Freda by Gessica Généus

Cannes Soundtrack Award
 Cannes Soundtrack Award:
 Ron Mael & Russell Mael for Annette 
 Rone for Paris, 13th District

Palm Dog
 Palm Dog Award: Rosie, Dora and Snowbear for The Souvenir Part II

Trophée Chopard
 Chopard Trophy: Jessie Buckley and Kingsley Ben-Adir
CNC Development Support for Best Project in La Résidence

 Saleh Kashefi for the project "Mammad"
 Inbar Horesh for the project "Birth Right"

References

External links
 

2021 film festivals
2021 in French cinema
2021
Events postponed due to the COVID-19 pandemic